The  or Osaka Metropolis was a plan to transform Osaka Prefecture from a fu, an urban prefecture, into a to, a metropolis. Under the initially envisioned plan, Osaka city, Sakai city, and other surrounding cities in Osaka prefecture, were to be dissolved and – similarly to Tokyo urban wards within Tokyo – subdivided into special wards that have a status as municipalities but leave some municipal tasks and revenues to the prefectural administration. As political resistance grew, notably the opposition to the plan in Sakai city expressed in the 2013 mayoral election, the concrete plan was reduced to, at least as a first step, abolish only Osaka city. As in Tokyo, the metropolis would have continued to include all other municipalities of the prefecture and serve as prefectural government for them.

The plan was defeated by a slim margin of 0.76% in the 2015 Osaka Metropolis Plan referendum in Osaka city.

After the April 2019 unified local elections and the June 2019 Sakai City mayoral election, the ORA again controls the governorship and a majority in the assembly, the mayorships of Osaka City and Sakai City, and strong pluralities in both city assemblies. Other parties have indicated to allow for a second metropolis plan referendum.

On November 1, 2020, a second referendum to merge Osaka’s 24 wards into 4 semi-autonomous wards was narrowly voted down. There were 692,996 (50.6%) votes against and 675,829 (49.4%) votes supported it. Osaka mayor and Osaka Ishin co-leader Ichiro Matsui said he would resign when his term ends in 2023.

Proponents
The plan is a main goal of the Osaka Restoration Association, a political party led by former Osaka governor and current Osaka city mayor Tōru Hashimoto. The party currently includes the governor of Osaka Prefecture, the mayor of Osaka City, a majority in the Osaka Prefectural Assembly and a plurality of seats in the assemblies of Osaka City and Sakai City.

Proposals
Under the Association's plan, the 24 wards of Osaka, seven wards of Sakai, and nine other municipalities in Osaka Prefecture would be reorganized into twenty special wards, each having municipal status similar to the special wards of Tokyo. As is the case in Tokyo, the prefectural government would be responsible for collecting fixed asset taxes and regional corporate taxes within this area, and would provide water, fire protection, public transit and other services through a unified administration for all 20 wards, while resident services and other administrative tasks would be handled by the wards themselves.

In July 2012, seven established parties in the National Diet (DPJ, LDP, Komeito, PNP, LF, Minna no To, Kizuna) and the Kaikaku-Mushozoku no Kai House of Representatives parliamentary group jointly submitted a bill that would create the legal framework to allow Ōsaka and Sakai cities to be split into special wards; the name change of Osaka prefecture from Osaka-fu to Osaka-to is not included, reserving the to designation for the prefecture of Tokyo. The law would also allow other major cities and their surrounding municipalities to reorganize as special wards and transfer municipal tasks to the prefectural government. Condition for application is an agglomeration population of 2 million and the agreement of all participating municipalities (by assembly vote and referendum) and the prefecture involved. Namely this would give the cities of Sapporo, Saitama, Chiba, Yokohama and Kawasaki, Nagoya, Kyoto, and Kobe the option to dissolve and transform Hokkaido, Saitama, Chiba, Kanagawa, Aichi, Kyoto or Hyōgo into "metropolises" like Tokyo. The bill was passed by the Diet in August 2012.

Four plans of special wards divided from Osaka City, as proposed by the project team in 2012:

Referendums

Effects 
Despite Osaka setting a nationwide precedent for putting to public vote a metropolitan plan with a 'no' result, Osaka and other cities continue trying to work a solution.  As of 2017, Yokohama city council strongly supports transforming into a special city – essentially: a prefecture-independent city – to eliminate duplication of services with the prefecture.  Nagoya city is still debating its own metropolitan plan and stated that the Osaka referendum has no impact as its plans are not the same.

Since individual cities and metropolises (Tokyo) are allowed to implement covid or any other emergency measures without central government approval, but not prefectures, this impacts Osaka's ability to implement coordinated measures across the prefecture without clearing it first with central authorities.

See also 
 Chukyo Metropolis proposal

References

External links 
 Yahoo News: News on the Osaka Metropolis plan 
 Ōsaka Ishin no Kai: Policies, About the Osaka Metropolis plan 
 Ōsaka shisei chōsakai (Osaka Institute for Municipal Research): Osaka Metropolis Plan Q&A 
 Daily Yomiuri Online, Mar. 3, 2012: Revitalizing Japan: Creative use of land / Revive a 'great Osaka' that can compete with Tokyo

Politics of Osaka Prefecture